Keith Howard McKee (15 December 1928 – 4 June 2021) was an Australian rules footballer who played with Geelong in the Victorian Football League (VFL).

Notes

External links 

1928 births
2021 deaths
Australian rules footballers from Victoria (Australia)
Geelong Football Club players
Geelong West Football Club players
Traralgon Football Club players